Daylam, also known in the plural form Daylaman (and variants such as Dailam, Deylam, and Deilam), was the name of a mountainous region of inland Gilan, Iran. It was so named for its inhabitants, known as the Daylamites.

The Church of the East established a metropolitan diocese for Daylam and Gilan around 790 under Shubhalishoʿ.

See also
Buyid dynasty
Daylami language
Talysh people
al-Daylami
Zaydiyyah
Nizari Ismaili state

References

Bibliography
 

Historical regions of Iran
History of Gilan